Lauren Cox (born 27 November 2001) is an English international swimmer. She has represented England at the Commonwealth Games.

Biography
Cox educated at Loughborough University won two medals including the gold medal in the 50 metres backstroke event, at the 2022 British Swimming Championships.

In 2022, she was selected for the 2022 Commonwealth Games in Birmingham where she competed in two events; the women's 50 metres backstroke, finishing in 4th place and the women's 100 metres backstroke, finishing in 5th place.

References

External links

2001 births
Living people
English female swimmers
British female swimmers
Swimmers at the 2022 Commonwealth Games
Commonwealth Games medallists in swimming
Commonwealth Games bronze medallists for England
21st-century English women
European Aquatics Championships medalists in swimming
Medallists at the 2022 Commonwealth Games